Elachista kurokoi is a moth in the family Elachistidae. It was described by Parenti in 1983. It is found in Japan (Honsyû, Sikoku, Kyûsyû, Tusima, Ryûkyû).

References

Moths described in 1983
kurokoi
Moths of Japan